is a turn-based strategy video game series developed and published by Japanese video game company Koei. The series is set in Yuan Dynasty of China (12th - 14th century), and based on the first Emperor of Yuan Dynasty - Genghis Khan. The gameplay is similar as Koei's Romance of the Three Kingdoms and Nobunaga's Ambition series. The second and the third title were released in Western.

Games 

  - 1985 (PC-98, PC-88, MZ-2500); 1986 (MSX, FM-7, X1)
  - 1987 (PC-88, PC-98, MSX2); 1988 (MSX2, MSX); 1989 (X68000, NES, DOS); 1990 (Amiga); 2003 (Windows); 2007 (Cellphones)
  - 1992 (PC-88, PC-98, MSX2); 1993 (FM-Towns, X68000, NES, SNES, Mega Drive, Mega Drive CD); 1998 (PlayStation)
  - 1998 (Windows); 1999 (PlayStation)

Genghis Khan video games
Koei games
Turn-based strategy video games
Video game franchises
Video game franchises introduced in 1985